The United Kingdom held a national preselection to choose the song that would go to the Eurovision Song Contest 1976. 

"Save Your Kisses for Me" won the national final, performed on stage with dance moves and four brightly dressed singers, it ultimately went on to win the Eurovision Song Contest itself.

Before Eurovision

A Song for Europe 1976 
Following the lowest published figure known for the public vote in the UK finals that used either voting by mail or telephone in 1975 and the BBC's choice of The Shadows singing all the shortlisted songs, calls from the Music Publishers Association for the songwriters and composers to be allowed to select the artist of their choice to perform the songs in future UK selections for Eurovision led to an 'all-comers' final being reinstated in 1976. It was a reversion to the format used for UK finals from 1961-1963. Twelve songs were chosen by the Music Publisher's Association, with the songwriters choosing their own artist.

Final 
The show took place on 25 February 1976 at the Royal Albert Hall in London. Michael Aspel (who had hosted the 1969 UK final) acted as presenter for the event. Fourteen regional juries voted on the songs: Bristol, Bangor, Leeds, Norwich, Newcastle, Aberdeen, Birmingham, Manchester, Belfast, Cardiff, Plymouth, Glasgow, Southampton and London. Each jury ranked the songs 1-12, awarding 12 points for their favourite down to 1 point for their least preferred. The songs were backed by the Alyn Ainsworth Orchestra. A Song for Europe was watched in 6.3 million homes (giving it a general viewing figure of 12.6 million viewers), and finishing as the 18th-most watched programme of the week. "Save Your Kisses for Me" won the national final and ultimately went on to win the Eurovision Song Contest itself. Host Michael Aspel did not name any of the jury spokespersons from the UK regions and none of them identified themselves by name, only naming the region they represented. 

Frank Ifield had taken part in the 1962 A Song for Europe contest in the UK, where he'd placed second. Polly Brown became the only artist to perform two songs in a multi-artist UK national final. Apart from her solo entry, Brown was also one half of the duo 'Sweet Dreams'. With a change in line-up, 'Co-Co' would return in the A Song for Europe 1978 contest, which they would win and go on to represent the UK in the Eurovision Song Contest. The band featured Cheryl Baker who ultimately won Eurovision for the UK in 1981 with Bucks Fizz. 'Sunshine' also returned two years later, also with a different line-up. Hazell Dean would return in the 1984 A Song for Europe contest.

Chart success 
International singing stars Dionne Warwick and Jean Terrell (former lead singer of The Supremes) both recorded and released versions of the song Do You Believe In Love At First Sight? despite the song's poor placing in the contest. Only the winning song reached the UK singles chart: "Save Your Kisses for Me" became a UK No.1 single, the group had a 2 further UK No.1 singles over the next 18 months. The track was the biggest selling single of 1976 in the UK and the sixth biggest selling for the 1970s in Britain, with sales well in excess of 1 million copies. Globally, the track attained sales of over 6 million, making it the biggest selling winning single in the history of the Eurovision Song Contest.

UK Discography 
Co-Co - Wake Up: PYE 7N45567.
Polly Brown - Do You Believe In Love At First Sight?: GTO GT54.
Dionne Warwick - Do You Believe In Love At First Sight?: Warner Bros. WBS8419.
Brotherhood of Man - Save Your Kisses For Me: PYE 7N45569.
Hazell Dean - I Couldn't Live Without You For A Day: Decca F13622.
Champagne - A Love For All Seasons: Thunderbird THE105.
Frank Ifield - Ain't Gonna Take No For An Answer: Spark SRL1136.
Sunshine - Maria: State STAT17.
Tammy Jones - Love's A Carousel: Epic SEPC3980.
Joey Valentine - Going To The Movies: Penny Farthing/Bellaphon BF18418.
Sweet Dreams - Love, Kiss And Run: Bradley's BRAD7604.
Louisa Jane White - Take The Money And Run: PYE 7N45568.
Tony Christie - Queen Of The Mardi Gras: MCA MCA231.

At Eurovision 
By scoring 164 points out of a possible maximum of 204, the UK achieved the highest relative score ever reached under the "Douze Points" voting system inaugurated in the Eurovision Song Contest 1975 and used ever since, with 80.40% of the possible score attained. No song has ever achieved this since, although previously in 1973, Luxembourg's winning entry scored 80.60% under a different voting system.

Michael Aspel provided the television commentary for the UK at the Eurovision Song Contest for BBC 1, Terry Wogan once again provided the radio commentary for BBC Radio 2 listeners and Andrew Pastouna provided commentary for British Forces Radio. Ray Moore acted as spokesperson for the UK Jury results.

Voting

Congratulations: 50 Years of the Eurovision Song Contest

"Save Your Kisses for Me" was one of fourteen Eurovision songs selected by fans to compete in the Congratulations 50th anniversary special in 2005. In spite of it and another British entry ("Congratulations") being among the participating songs, as well as the presence of Katrina Leskanich (of the UK's victorious 1997 act Katrina and the Waves) as co-host, the United Kingdom did not broadcast Congratulations as they felt it wouldn't attract enough of an audience. They opted to create their own special, Boom Bang-a-Bang: 50 Years of Eurovision, hosted by 1998 host and longtime British commentator Sir Terry Wogan.

The song was drawn to appear thirteenth in the running order, following "Hold Me Now" by Johnny Logan and preceding "My Number One" by Helena Paparizou. At the end of the first round, "Save Your Kisses for Me" was announced as one of the five songs advancing to the final round. It was later revealed that the song finished fifth, scoring 154 points.

"Save Your Kisses for Me" ultimately finished fifth in the final round, scoring 230 points (including, as in 1976, a maximum 12 from Israel).

Voting

Notes

References

External links
 
 BBC's official Eurovision website

1976
Countries in the Eurovision Song Contest 1976
Eurovision
Eurovision